Estalaj (also Romanized as Estelaj; also known as Astalach and Astlaj) is a village in Shahidabad Rural District, Central District, Avaj County, Qazvin Province, Iran. At the 2006 census, its population was 874, in 210 families.

References 

Populated places in Avaj County